Mancha Real is a city located in the province of Jaén, Spain. According to the 2020 census (INE), the city has a population of 11, 328 inhabitants.

References

External links 

 Mancha Real Town Council
 Local football teams: Atlético Mancha Real & Asociación Deportiva Mancha Real
 Houses in Mancha Real

Municipalities in the Province of Jaén (Spain)